A blue supergiant (BSG) is a hot, luminous star, often referred to as an OB supergiant.  They have luminosity class I and spectral class B9 or earlier.

Blue supergiants are found towards the top left of the Hertzsprung–Russell diagram, above and to the right of the main sequence.  They are larger than the Sun but smaller than a red supergiant, with surface temperatures of 10,000–50,000 K and luminosities from about 10,000 to a million times that of the Sun.

Formation

Supergiants are evolved high-mass stars, larger and more luminous than main-sequence stars.  O class and early B class stars with initial masses around  evolve away from the main sequence in just a few million years as their hydrogen is consumed and heavy elements (with atomic numbers of 26 (Fe) and less) start to appear near the surface of the star. These stars usually become blue supergiants, although it is possible that some of them evolve directly to Wolf–Rayet stars. Expansion into the supergiant stage occurs when hydrogen in the core of the star is depleted and hydrogen shell burning starts, but it may also be caused as heavy elements are dredged up to the surface by convection and mass loss due to radiation pressure increases.

Blue supergiants are newly evolved from the main sequence, have extremely high luminosities, high mass loss rates, and are generally unstable. Many of them become luminous blue variables (LBVs) with episodes of extreme mass loss.  Lower mass blue supergiants continue to expand until they become red supergiants.  In the process they must spend some time as yellow supergiants or yellow hypergiants, but this expansion occurs in just a few thousand years and so these stars are rare. Higher mass red supergiants blow away their outer atmospheres and evolve back to blue supergiants, and possibly onwards to Wolf–Rayet stars. Depending on the exact mass and composition of a red supergiant, it can execute a number of blue loops before either exploding as a type II supernova or finally dumping enough of its outer layers to become a blue supergiant again, less luminous than the first time but more unstable. If such a star can pass through the yellow evolutionary void it is expected that it becomes one of the lower luminosity LBVs.

The most massive blue supergiants are too luminous to retain an extensive atmosphere and they never expand into a red supergiant. It is not clear whether more massive blue supergiants can lose enough mass to evolve safely into old age as a Wolf Rayet star and finally a white dwarf, or they reach the Wolf Rayet stage and explode as supernovae, or they explode as supernovae while blue supergiants.

Supernova progenitors are most commonly red supergiants and it was believed that only red supergiants could explode as supernovae. SN 1987A, however, forced astronomers to re-examine this theory, as its progenitor, Sanduleak -69° 202, was a B3 blue supergiant. Now it is known from observation that almost any class of evolved high-mass star, including blue and yellow supergiants, can explode as a supernova although theory still struggles to explain how in detail. While most supernovae are of the relatively homogeneous type II-P and are produced by red supergiants, blue supergiants are observed to produce supernovae with a wide range of luminosities, durations, and spectral types, sometimes sub-luminous like SN 1987A, sometimes super-luminous such as many type IIn supernovae.

Properties

Because of their extreme masses they have relatively short lifespans and are mainly observed in young cosmic structures such as open clusters, the arms of spiral galaxies, and in irregular galaxies. They are rarely observed in spiral galaxy cores, elliptical galaxies, or globular clusters, most of which are believed to be composed of older stars, although the core of the Milky Way has recently been found to be home to several massive open clusters and associated young hot stars.

The best known example is Rigel, the brightest star in the constellation of Orion. Its mass is about 20 times that of the Sun, and its luminosity is around 117,000 times greater. Despite their rarity and their short lives they are heavily represented among the stars visible to the naked eye; their immense brightness is more than enough to compensate for their scarcity.

Blue supergiants have fast stellar winds and the most luminous, called hypergiants, have spectra dominated by emission lines that indicate strong continuum driven mass loss. Blue supergiants show varying quantities of heavy elements in their spectra, depending on their age and the efficiency with which the products of nucleosynthesis in the core are convected up to the surface. Quickly rotating supergiants can be highly mixed and show high proportions of helium and even heavier elements while still burning hydrogen at the core; these stars show spectra very similar to a Wolf Rayet star.

While the stellar wind from a red supergiant is dense and slow, the wind from a blue supergiant is fast but sparse. When a red supergiant becomes a blue supergiant, the faster wind it produces impacts the already emitted slow wind and causes the outflowing material to condense into a thin shell. In some cases, several concentric faint shells can be seen from successive episodes of mass loss, either previous blue loops from the red supergiant stage, or eruptions such as LBV outbursts.

Examples 
 MACS J1149 Lensed Star 1 (or Icarus) – most distant individual star detected
 Rigel (β Orionis), a blue-white (B-type) supergiant
 UW Canis Majoris (UW CMa), a blue (O-type) supergiant
 Zeta Puppis (Naos), a blue (O-type) supergiant

References